Conistra erythrocephala, the red-headed chestnut, is a moth of the family Noctuidae. It is distributedin central and southern Europe and is recorded from Asia Minor, (Amasia).

Technical description and variation

C. erythrocephala F. (35 g). Forewing dull red-brown, suffused to a greater or less degree with grey; lines obscure, indistinctly double ; the submarginal with a darker blotch before it on costa; upper stigmata generally filled up with grey, with paler brown-edged annuli, often obscure and unicolorous : the reniform generally with black spots round its lower end; hindwing greyish fuscous; the fringe pale ochreous; in ab. glabra Hbn. (35 g) the ground colour is darker, more purplish-brown, with the costal streak, the two stigmata, and a submarginal  fascia pale grey; the lines are also generally paler and more evident; — ab. impunctata Spul. (35 g) has the reniform stigma unmarked by black points, the other markings being often in these cases more obscure, and the ground colour striated with dark; in pallida Tutt (35 g) the dark ground colour is overlaid and hidden by pale grey suffusion. Larva grey brown or yellowish-brown; dorsal and subdorsal lines fine and pale, the latter sometimes obsolete; the dorsum dotted with white; spiracles black.

Biology
The moths fly from August/September to early May (it is active in Winter). The caterpillars live from mid-April to June.

Recorded food plants
The larvae feed on young leaves of oak (Quercus species) and elm (Ulmus species) before descending to feed on herbaceous plants.

References

External links
Lepiforum.de
Vlindernet.nl 

Cuculliinae
Moths described in 1775
Moths of Asia
Moths of Europe
Taxa named by Michael Denis
Taxa named by Ignaz Schiffermüller